Lisboa VIVA is a contactless smartcard used for electronic ticketing as part of the transportation system of  Lisbon metropolitan area.  It is in use on the Lisbon Metro and mandatory on Carris since 2004. The system was provided by Thales.

Use
The card is scanned at the black circle on the reader, at up to 5 cm. A beep will be heard, and a light will show. If the season ticket is valid, there is a short sound and a green light; if not, there is a longer sound and the light shows red.

External links
http://www.portalviva.pt
http://www.carris.pt/en/index.php?area=balcao&subarea=passes_e_bilhetes_viva
https://web.archive.org/web/20091024183620/http://www.transportbenchmarks.eu/pdf/Reports/UTB-BEHAVIOURAL-REPORT-ANNEX-A2.2pdf.pdf

Transport in Lisbon
Fare collection systems in Portugal
Contactless smart cards